Mary Elizabeth Davies (11 October 1925 – 3 June 2015) was a Welsh chess player, Welsh Women's Chess Championship winner (1974).

Biography
In the 1970s Mary Elizabeth Davies was one of the best chess female player in Wales. She has won Welsh Women's Chess Championship in 1974.

Mary Elizabeth Davies played for Wales in the Chess Olympiad:
In 1976, at third board in the 7th Chess Olympiad (women) in Haifa (+3, =0, -5).

References

External links

Mary Elizabeth Davies chess games at 365chess.com

1925 births
2015 deaths
Welsh chess players
Chess Olympiad competitors